Raofat is an Egyptian surname. Notable people with the surname include:

 Diaa Raofat (born 1988), Egyptian footballer
 Rami Raofat (born 1990), Egyptian-Danish footballer

See also
 Rafat (surname)

Arabic-language surnames